Lynda L. Stipe (born September 30, 1962) is an American singer and bass guitarist. She is best recognized for her involvement in the bands Oh-OK, Hetch Hetchy and Flash to Bang Time. She is the younger sister of R.E.M.'s lead singer Michael Stipe.

Biography
In 1980, Lynda Stipe became involved in Athens' music scene when she was invited by her older brother Michael Stipe to serve as the opening act for one of his bands. Along with vocalist Linda Hopper and drummer David Pierce, the group performed several songs live at the 40 Watt Club. The songs written for that performance would be recorded in the studio for Oh-OK's first single. The band produced one single and an album before parting ways in 1984.

Stipe later formed Hetch Hetchy with boyfriend and fellow musician Jay Totty in 1988, with her serving as lead vocalist and bass guitarist. In 1988, they recorded the EP Make Djibouti with several friends. It was issued through Texas Hotel and was produced by Michael Stipe. Afterward, Stipe and Totty opted to continue recording as a duo. Hetch Hetchy's debut album Swollen was released in 1990 and marked a musical departure from the band's previous recordings. Produced by Hahn Rowe and Tim Sommer of Hugo Largo, the music drew inspiration from gothic rock, dream pop and British folk music. Stipe has noted that the album better represented her writing abilities and contained arrangements that were better realized. A new Hetch Hetchy record was in development but Stipe and Totty broke off their relationship, effectively ending the group in 1991.

Discography

Oh-OK

Hetch Hetchy

Other appearances

References
General

 
 

Notes

1962 births
Living people
20th-century American singers
21st-century American singers
American rock singers
American women singer-songwriters
American women rock singers
Women bass guitarists
Musicians from Athens, Georgia
People from Decatur, Georgia
Guitarists from Georgia (U.S. state)
20th-century American women singers
20th-century American bass guitarists
21st-century American women singers
21st-century American bass guitarists
20th-century American women writers
Singer-songwriters from Georgia (U.S. state)